Pejorative terms for women